Dennis Hayden (born April 7, 1952) is an American actor, producer and writer, most famous for his role as Eddie, one of the main terrorists in the popular 1988 action film Die Hard.

Early life
Dennis Hayden was one of five brothers and one sister born in Girard, Kansas on a pig and soybean farm. He worked the wheat harvest during summers off from high school, graduating in 1970. He worked the summer wheat harvests and played football, becoming the number one tackle in Kansas. He attended Fort Scott Junior College for the game, but then, when he was nineteen, decided to head to the West Coast and try out acting. At this point, he got involved in theater, commercials, TV and films.

In popular culture
Hayden's Die Hard character, Eddie, was parodied in The Cleveland Show'''s parody episode, "Die Semi-Hard", where he is voiced by rocker Huey Lewis, because actor Dennis Hayden and Huey Lewis look very similar. The character is not given a name, and is called "the guy who looks like Huey Lewis". This is kind of an inside joke between fans because for years, they have been noting the similarities between the two.

Dennis Hayden is the white coach in the new Von Miller Old Spice Commercials 2017.

Filmography

 1985 Tomboy as Bartender
 1986 Murphy's Law as Sonny
 1986 Jo Jo Dancer, Your Life Is Calling as Policeman #1
 1987 Slam Dance as Mean Drunk
 1988 Action Jackson as Shaker
 1988 Die Hard as Eddie
 1990 Another 48 Hrs. as Barroom Tough
 1993 Midnight Witness as Cowboy
 1994 One Man Army as Eddie Taylor
 1995 Beyond Desire as Lieutenant Davis
 1995 Wild Bill as Phil Coe
 1995 The Random Factor as Senator James Lockholt
 1995 Fatal Choice as Jim Kale
 1997 George B. as Tom
 1997 Wishmaster as Security Guard
 2000 Stageghost as Merrill
 2001 Knight Club as Cowboy
 2001 Echos of Enlightenment as Frank Savage
 2002 Sniper 2 as Klete
 2003 The Negative Pick-Up as T (Tall Man)
 2003 The Librarians as Bouncer (uncredited)
 2005 Purple Hearth as Earl
 2007 Carts as Ted
 2008 Trucker as Trucker
 2008 Light Years Away as Launch Guard #1
 2009 Race to Witch Mountain as Ray
 2009 A Way with Murder as T
 2009 Dead in Love as 'Slim' Sheppard
 2012 Night of the Living Dead 3D: Re-Animation as Tall Zombie
 2016 A Journey to a Journey'' as President Warren Benchley

External links

 http://www.dennishayden.com/index.html

1952 births
Male actors from Kansas
American male film actors
Living people
People from Girard, Kansas
American male television actors
20th-century American male actors
21st-century American male actors